Miss Russia 2014, was held in the Crocus National Exhibition Hall in Moscow on March 1, 2014. 50 contestants from all over Russia competed for the crown. Elmira Abdrazakova of Mezhdurechensk crowned her successor, Yulia Alipova, who represents Russia into Miss Universe 2013 and Miss World 2013. Gabriela Isler and Megan Young participated in the event.

Each year, there are 477 beauty contests in states and cities of Russia to go to compete in the Miss Russia. Each year, 4 months before the national competition, a pre-preliminary happens in Moscow to select the 50 official candidates. In 2014 for the first time, the public selected the 20th semifinalist by Internet votes.

Results

Placements

¤Was voted to Top 20

Contestants

References

External links
 Miss Russia Official Website

Miss Russia
2014 beauty pageants
2014 in Russia